Folketing elections were held in Denmark on 5 April 1898.

Results

References

Elections in Denmark
Denmark
Folketing
Denmark